Kamea may refer to:

 Kamea (dance company), from Beer Sheva, Israel
 Nao Kamea (born 1982), Papua New Guinean cricketer
 Magic square, sometimes also referred to as a kamea
 Kamea language, Papua New Guinean language